Hooe may refer to:

People
 Bernard Hooe Jr., American lawyer, member of the Virginia House of Delegates and mayor of Alexandria
 Rice Hooe, the name of three Virginia colonists, including Rhys Hooe (c. 1599 – after 1655)
Robert T. Hooe, District of Columbia Justice of the Peace

Places
Hooe, East Sussex, England
Hooe, Plymouth, England

See also

United States v. Hooe, a 1803 United States Supreme Court case
Lloyd House (Alexandria, Virginia), also known as the Wise-Hooe-Loyd house